This One's for Basie is a 1957 studio album by Buddy Rich and an eleven piece orchestra, recorded in tribute to bandleader Count Basie.  The album was re-issued by Verve in the 1950s and again (retitled Big Band Shout) in the 1960s  (but without "Blues for Basie").

Track listing
LP side A
"Blue and Sentimental" (Count Basie, Mack David, Jerry Livingston) – 4:49
"Down for Double" (Freddie Green) – 4:10
"Jump for Me" (Basie) – 5:45
"Blues for Basie" (Harry "Sweets" Edison) – 7:20
LP side B
"Jumpin' at the Woodside" (Basie) – 6:26
"Ain't It the Truth" (Basie, Buster Harding, Jack Palmer) – 3:01
"Shorty George" (Basie, Andy Gibson) – 5:14
"9:20 Special" (William Engvick, Earle Warren) – 4:34

Personnel
Pete Candoli - trumpet
Harry "Sweets" Edison - trumpet
Conrad Gozzo - trumpet
Frank Rosolino - trombone
Buddy Collette - flute, baritone saxophone, tenor saxophone
Bob Enevoldsen - tenor saxophone, valve trombone
Bob Cooper - tenor saxophone
Joe Mondragon - double bass
Bill Pitman - guitar
Jimmy Rowles - piano
Buddy Rich - drums
Marty Paich - arranger

References
Norgran MGN 1086
Verve MGV 8176
Verve V/V6 8712 (as Big Band Shout)
This One's for Basie at jazzdisco.org (Verve MGV 8176, Norgran MGN 1086)
Big Band Shout at jazzdisco.org (Verve V/V6 8712)

1957 albums
Buddy Rich albums
Albums arranged by Marty Paich
Albums produced by Norman Granz
Tribute albums
Verve Records albums
Norgran Records albums